Tet (styled as tet, previously Lattelekom and Lattelecom) is a Latvian internet service provider, telecommunications, technology and entertainment company. Since 2017, it also is an electricity service provider.

The Tet Group provides IT, telecommunication and outsourced business process solutions that are provided by the five companies of the group  SIA Tet, Lattelecom BPO, Citrus Solutions and Lattelecom Technology with its subsidiary Baltic Computer Academy (BDA). The Lattelecom Group is the leading provider of electronic communications services in Latvia that offers electronic communication solutions for home, small and medium size businesses, state and municipal institutions, as well as for corporate clients.

51% of Tet shares are owned by the Latvian government, but the remaining  49%  by the Scandinavian company Telia Company. Tet in turn owns 23% of the Latvian mobile operator's LMT shares.

History

Origin 
The Latvian state-owned State Company Tet was registered with the Register of Enterprises of the Republic of Latvia on January 9, 1992. Its origins were based on the leftover local infrastructure and services previously operated by the Soviet Ministry of Communications. Nearly two years later – on December 22, 1993, the Cabinet of Ministers of the Republic of Latvia approved the commissions decision to announce the British and Finnish consortium TILTS Communications the winner of the tender „On the modernisation of Latvia’s telecommunications network”, and the company became a strategic investor in Lattelekom. On January 14, 1994, the agreement with TILTS Communications was concluded and SIA Lattelekom established. As a result of privatisation 49% of the company's shares were procured by two foreign investors  Cable and Wireless and Telecom Finland which later became a part of the Swedish telecommunications company TeliaSonera AB.

Cable and Wireless later sold its shares to TeliaSonera, as a result of which 51% of the company's shares are presently owned by the Latvian government, but 49%  by TeliaSonera. Until January 1, 2003, the company held monopoly on fixed voice communication services thereby turning into the leading fixed telephony operator.

Monopoly 
Until relatively recently, Lattelecom had a monopoly rights on fixed-line voice communications in Latvia, which ended on January 1, 2003. The Latvian fixed telecommunications market is now open to competition but Lattelecom still has an overwhelming share of the market, and the company is also one of leading internet service providers in Latvia and is one of the owners of Latvijas Mobilais Telefons, Latvia's largest cell phone operator.

First rebrand (2006) 
On May 18, 2006, Lattelecom implemented the so-called rebranding, replacing the existing corporate brand name with a new brand name. The change aimed to improve the correlation between the Lattelecom brand name, products and services, and attain higher efficiency of communication and costs and position Lattelecom as a market leader, justifying it with sufficient proof. Prior to 2006, the company had already undergone reorganisation, procuring also a new company (SIA Lattelecom Technology), whereby the change of the brand name marked the termination of said conversion process – the new brand name combined into one great whole all Groups companies that were directly engaged in providing customer services, client business process outsourcing and IT&T and content services.

The official company name, SIA Lattelekom was changed to SIA Lattelecom. The name of the IT service provider SIA MicroLink Latvia was changed to Lattelecom Technology, whereas SIA C1 that had been engaged in business process outsourcing business was renamed SIA Lattelecom BPO. Given the business specifics, the name of the network construction and maintenance company SIA Citrus Solutions remained as is. In addition, Citrus Solutions also attained its individual graphical identity that differs from that of the other Groups companies, as the company provides services to external IT&T companies that are believed to be Lattelecom Group competitors.

Second rebrand (2019) 
In October 2018, Lattelecom announced that they will gradually change their name to Tet, their electricity service providers' name used since 2016, with the change officially starting from on April 1, 2019. All divisions except entertainment which will use the recently introduced Helio and Shortcut brands.

Lattelecom Group 

Lattelecom Group consists of five companies: SIA Tet, SIA Lattelecom BPO, SIA Citrus Solutions, SIA Lattelecom Technology and the subsidiary owned by the latter  SIA Baltijas Datoru Akadēmija. Tet is specialised in providing Internet, voice and TV services. Lattelecom BPO offers client service solutions, business process outsourcing (BPO), and 1188 directory inquiry services. Lattelecom Technology provides integrated IT solutions and services.  Baltijas Datoru Akadēmija is a training and certification centre providing services to information and communication technology (ICT) professionals and users, whereas Citrus Solutions that is formed through separating the former Network Maintenance Division from the parent company Tet offers integrated network infrastructure construction and security system solutions.

Products and services

tet Internet 
Tet is the country's largest internet service provider. Tet offers various Internet connection types  broadband DSL Internet, Optical Fiber Internet GPON Internet, wireless solutions or Wi-Fi and 4G internet.

Optical fiber Internet 

In 2009 Lattelecom started offering residential fiber optic services with up to 100 megabits per second high Internet bandwidth. In September 2009 an announcement was made that Lattelecom had upgraded its fiber optic bandwidth up to 1 gigabits per second. Zolitūde was the first residential area in Riga where the Lattelecom fiber optic Internet service was made available (in January 2009), followed later by Kengarags, Purvciems, Plavnieki, Ziepniekkalns and other locations. Jelgava was the first city where fiber optic Internet was made available from areas other than Riga, but late in 2009 the Lattelecom fiber optic service was also made accessible in other cities, such as Daugavpils, Salaspils, etc. Initially, fiber optic network expansion work was carried out in the newly built dwelling areas in Riga and other largest cities of the country the rational being that return on the investment in the development of the network is possible to attain only if the newly connected building has at least 30 apartments.

The service is provided using GPON technology that enables 100 megabits per second bandwidth accessible from any connection point (apartment). In the middle of 2012, Lattelecom fiber optic internet was available to 450,000 households throughout Latvia, which is half of all Latvian households.  The total infrastructure covers more than 45 towns and residential areas in Latvia.

Baltic Highway 

A significant data transfer route, the Baltic Highway opened in 2012. It ensures the highest quality data transfer through the Baltic States, Poland and Germany, with an extension to the Russian Federation. The project for the construction of a united optical fiber infrastructure was implemented by Lattelecom, in cooperation with Deutsche Telekom and MegaFon. The Baltic Highway will ensure n*10 Gbps data transfer rate (the initial capacity of the system is 40 x 10 Gbit/s), and it will be the geographically shortest route between Germany and Russia.  The total infrastructure covers more than 45 towns and residential areas in Latvia. The Baltic Highway infrastructure will be an alternative transfer route for the earlier Nordic Route (Russia-Sweden-Germany) and South Route (Russia-Ukraine-Germany) networks.

Wi-Fi 
Currently more than 4,500 Wi-Fi access points are available throughout Latvia.

Lattelecom TV 
In 2011 Lattelecom became the largest TV service provider in the Baltic States, reaching a total of 230,000 charge TV customers subscribing to the company's three TV services – Terrestrial television, Interactive television and Internet television.

Since March 1, 2011, the company started to offer Internet TV on mobile devices, for instance, smartphones and tablet computers, thus becoming the first television operator in the Baltic States to enable people to watch television on four types of screens – not only traditional TV sets, but also computers, tablet computers and cell phones.

Interactive TV/Helio iTV 
Lattelecom Interactive TV, soon to be known as Helio iTV, is a high-definition television service that provides diverse functionality, such as virtual rent a video, timeshift, recording of programmes and films, etc. The Interactive TV signal is transmitted over a broadband Internet connection that enables access to both the Internet and TV using a single wire (telephone line).

Digital Terrestrial TV/Helio vTv 

As of the early part of 2009 and after having won the Ministry of Transport of the Republic of Latvia tender, Lattelecom jointly with the Latvian State Radio and Television Centre (LVRTC) made transition from analogue to digital TV broadcasting system.

Lattelecom Terrestrial TV enabled digital over-the-air broadcasting of TV signals that can be received using an indoor or external aerial. Terrestrial TV provides free access to all national and other free channels of the country.

Tet+ 

Online television has been available in Latvia since 2010, when it was made public in test mode. Currently Online television is available in Latvia only.

Internet television on mobile devices has been available since March 2012. It is the first television service in Latvia that enables watching television not only at a time and place convenient to the client, but on various devices – PC, tablet computer and smartphone.

In 2016, Lattelecom launched an online streaming service and an entertainment platform Shortcut.

Privatisation

Tet is a former state-owned telecommunications company. In 1994, 49% of the company's stock was sold to two foreign investors, Cable and Wireless and Telecom Finland, which is now part of TeliaSonera. Cable and Wireless later sold its stake to TeliaSonera, which now owns 49% of the company. The remaining 51% of the company still belongs to Latvian government.

Profits and performance

The revenue of Lattelecom in 2011 amounted to LVL 135.8 million, which is a LVL 3.8 million drop year on year. Television and Internet services accounted for the largest increase in revenue, as the number of subscribers grew rapidly. Turnover of data services has also increased, whilst the revenues from voice calls continue to decline. The normalized EBITDA profit indicator of Lattelecom in 2011 was LVL 47.5 million. (LVL 45.6 million in 2010), EBITDA profit norm of 35%. The profit of Lattelecom in 2011 amounted to LVL 20.8 million, which is an 8% increase from 2010 (LVL 19.3 million).

Headcount 

2,174 employees worked for Lattelecom group as of late 2011.

Connect, Latvia! 
Connect, Latvia! (Pieslēdzies, Latvija!) is a unique project in Latvia, which provides people aged over 50 with the opportunity to acquire basic PC literacy skills, thus reducing the number of people incapable of working with a PC or the Internet. 150 groups were organized throughout Latvia in 2011, with more than 1,500 people acquiring the basics of theoretical and practical PC skills. In 2012 computer sciences teachers were attracted for the training of senior clients, thus raising the number of trainees to 6,000. 
Training for seniors is organized in small groups – approximately 14 participants per group. Training in each group lasts three days, spending four academic hours (45 minutes each) on training daily.

References 

Companies based in Riga
Telecommunications companies of Latvia
1992 establishments in Latvia